Yaqubzai are a Pashtun tribe of Gandapur living in Afghanistan and Pakistan.

History 
Yaquzais are the descendants of Yaqub, the eldest son of Gandapur. Yaqub though the eldest one, was not the most brilliant of his four sons and hence the whole family of Gandapur was led by Ibrahim Khan the second son. The descendants of Ibrahim Khan are known as Ibrahim Zai(sons of Ibrahim). Yaquzai are a small segment of the whole tribe of Gandapurs. They have played no worth mentioning role in the Gandapur tribe struggle to establish themselves at Kulachi, Dera Ismail Khan in the 16th century A.D. 

The original name of Gandapur was Tairi Khan. He had four sons and a daughter. The names of the sons and daughter are as follows; 
 Yaqub Khan (His descendants known as Yaqub Zai)
 Ibrahim Khan (His descendants known as Ibrahim Zai)
 Hussain Khan (His descendants known as Hussain Zai)
 Dre Plaara (His descendants are not known)
 Khubai the daughter of Gandapur. The descendants of her son Kamal are known as Kamal Khel.

Gandapur Pashtun tribes
Pashto-language surnames
Pakistani names